The 1995–96 Mississippi State Bulldogs men's basketball team represented Mississippi State University in the 1995–96 NCAA Division I men's basketball season. Led by head coach Richard Williams, the Bulldogs won the SEC tournament and reached the Final Four.

Roster

Schedule and results

|-
!colspan=9 style=| Regular season

|-
!colspan=9 style=| SEC Tournament

|-
!colspan=9 style=| NCAA Tournament

Sources

Rankings

Team players in the 1996 NBA draft

References

Mississippi State
Mississippi State Bulldogs men's basketball seasons
NCAA Division I men's basketball tournament Final Four seasons
Mississippi State